Yogesh  Verma (born 10 March 1973) is an Indian politician and a member of 17th Legislative Assembly, and  Y.D.P.G. Student,  Uttar Pradesh of India. He represents the ‘Lakhimpur’ constituency in Lakhimpur district of Uttar Pradesh.

Political career
Yogesh Verma contested Uttar Pradesh Assembly Election as Bharatiya Janata Party candidate and defeated his close contestant Utkarsh Verma from Samajwadi Party with a margin of 37,748 votes.

Posts held

References

People from Lakhimpur Kheri
Bharatiya Janata Party politicians from Uttar Pradesh
Living people
Uttar Pradesh MLAs 2017–2022
1973 births
Uttar Pradesh MLAs 2022–2027